Acropora valida is a species of acroporid coral found in the Red Sea, the Gulf of Aden, the southwestern, northwestern and northern Indian Ocean, the Persian Gulf, the central Indo-Pacific, Australia, southeast Asia, Japan, the East China Sea, the oceanic western, central and far eastern Pacific Ocean, the northwestern Hawaiian Islands and Johnston Atoll.

Taxonomy
It was originally described as Madrepora valida by Dana in 1846.

Description
It is found in colonies of varying shapes, with diameters sometimes above . It has small axial corallites and its radial corallites are appressed and in a variety of sizes. It is brown, cream, or yellow in colour, and branch tips are sometimes purple. It looks similar to Acropora variabilis.

Distribution
It is classed as a least concern species on the IUCN Red List, but it is believed that its population is decreasing in line with the global decline of coral reefs, and it is listed under Appendix II of CITES. Figures of its population are unknown, but is likely to be threatened by the global reduction of coral reefs, the increase of temperature causing coral bleaching, climate change, human activity, the crown-of-thorns starfish (Acanthaster planci) and disease. It occurs in the Red Sea, the Gulf of Aden, the southwestern, northwestern and northern Indian Ocean, the Persian Gulf, the central Indo-Pacific, Australia, southeast Asia, Japan, the East China Sea, the oceanic western, central and far eastern Pacific Ocean, the northwestern Hawaiian Islands and Johnston Atoll.

References

Acropora
Cnidarians of the Pacific Ocean
Fauna of the Indian Ocean
Fauna of the Red Sea
Marine fauna of Asia
Marine fauna of Oceania
Fauna of Southeast Asia
Vulnerable fauna of Asia
Vulnerable fauna of Oceania
Corals described in 1846